Dynasty International School is a secondary school in the Faridabad district of the Indian state of Haryana. Located in Sector 28 of the district, it is an affiliated to India's Central Board of Secondary Education and was founded in the mid-1980s by Bimla Verma. They are known for there well planned academic and their sports academy.

References

External links
 Official Website

Schools in Faridabad